Ocellacarus is a genus of mites in the family Acaridae.

Species
 Ocellacarus congregatus S. Mahunka, 1979
 Ocellacarus echidna Mahunka, 1979

References

Acaridae